Lobata is a district of São Tomé and Príncipe, on São Tomé Island. The district seat is Guadalupe. It is divided into the four statistical subdistricts Guadalupe, Santo Amaro, Conde and Micoló.

Geography
The district includes an islet called the Ilhéu das Cabras. Numerous beaches dot the coast, including Praia de Lagoa Azul, das Conchas, Guegue Micoló, das Plancas and dos Tamarindos. The eastern part of the district is increasingly urbanised due to its proximity to the city São Tomé.

Population

Settlements
The main settlement is the town Guadalupe. Other settlements are:

Agostinho Neto
Bela Vista
Boa Entrada
Boa Esperança
Conde
Fernão Dias
Maianço
Micoló
Praia das Conchas
Santo Amaro

Landmarks and points of interest
Lagoa Azul, a bay in the west of the district.
Lagoa Azul Lighthouse - west of Morro Peixe
Roça Boa Entrada
Roça do Rio Ouro in Agostinho Neto

Politics
Lobata currently has six seats in the National Assembly.

Notable people
William Barbosa, footballer
Olinda Beja, writer
Aurélio Martins, journalist, businessman and politician
Ludgério Silva, footballer

Twin towns
Seixal, Portugal
Sousel, Portugal
Vila Nova de Famalicão, Portugal

References

External links

 
Districts of São Tomé and Príncipe
São Tomé Island